Trying to Make Heaven My Home is an album led by saxophonist Billy Harper recorded on March 3 and 4, 1979, at Tonstudio Zuckerfabrik in Stuttgart (Germany) and released on the German MPS label.

Reception 

In his review for AllMusic, Michael G. Nastos states "A quintet recording for this incendiary tenor saxophonist. An extended, hard-blowing session".

Track listing 
All compositions by Billy Harper
 "Trying to Make Heaven My Home" - 18:00
 "Inside" - 8:29
 "Love on the Sudan" - 11:52

Personnel 
Billy Harper - tenor saxophone
Everett Hollins - trumpet
Armen Donelian - piano
Wayne Dockery - bass
Malcolm Pinson - drums

References 

1979 albums
Billy Harper albums
MPS Records albums